Saúde (health in the Portuguese language) may refer to:
 Saúde, Bahia
 Saúde, Rio de Janeiro
 Saúde (district of São Paulo)
 Saúde (São Paulo Metro)

See also
 Saude (disambiguation)